Norwood v. Harrison, 413 U.S. 455 (1973), is a United States Supreme Court decision in the area of constitutional law which the court held that a state cannot provide aid to a private school which discriminates on the basis of race.

Facts of the Case
Textbooks were being purchased by the state of Mississippi and given to students for free in both public and private schools pursuant a statute passed in 1940.  Among the schools with students receiving textbooks was Tunica Academy, which declined to attest that it had a racially non-discriminatory admissions policy. The District Court decided in favor of the state and the Supreme Court heard oral arguments February 20 and 21, 1973. The case was argued by civil rights attorney Melvyn R. Leventhal.

The Court's Decision
The Supreme Court ruled that a state may not constitutionally give or lend textbooks to students who attend a school that discriminates on the basis of race, otherwise the discriminatory conduct of the private school could be considered state action and would thus be in violation of the Constitution.

The opinion of the court was authored by Chief Justice Burger and was joined by Stewart, White, Marshall, Blackmun, Powell, and Rehnquist. Justices Douglas and Brennan wrote concurring opinions.

The Court held that Mississippi was not obligated under the Equal Protection Clause to provide equal assistance to private schools and public schools, ruling that the state does have a constitutional obligation to avoid providing financial assistance to schools that practice racist or other invidious discrimination.

References

External links
 

Education segregation in Mississippi
United States school desegregation case law
United States Supreme Court cases
United States Supreme Court cases of the Burger Court
1973 in United States case law
United States equal protection case law